Bageh Jan (also Romanized as Bageh Jān and Bagahjān; also known as Bāgh-e Jān and Bāgh-ī-Jān) is a village in Yeylan-e Shomali Rural District, in the Central District of Dehgolan County, Kurdistan Province, Iran. At the 2006 census, its population was 656, in 128 families. The village is populated by Kurds.

References 

Towns and villages in Dehgolan County
Kurdish settlements in Kurdistan Province